Jamestown is a city in southern Chautauqua County, in the U.S. state of New York. The population was 28,712 at the 2020 census. Situated between Lake Erie to the north and the Allegheny National Forest to the south, Jamestown is the largest population center in the county. Nearby Chautauqua Lake is a freshwater resource used by fishermen, boaters, and naturalists.

Notable people from Jamestown include legendary comedienne Lucille Ball, U.S. Supreme Court justice and Nuremberg chief prosecutor Robert H. Jackson, musician Natalie Merchant, musician Dennis Drew, musician John Lombardo, naturalist Roger Tory Peterson, NFL head coach Nick Sirianni, and NFL Commissioner Roger Goodell.

In the 20th century, Jamestown was a thriving industrial area, noted for producing several well-known products.  They include the crescent wrench, produced by Karl Peterson's the Crescent Tool Company in Jamestown beginning in 1907. and the automatic lever voting machine, manufactured by the Automatic Voting Machine Company, which dominated the lever voting machine industry from its location on Jones and Gifford Avenue in Jamestown until its bankruptcy in 1983.  Jamestown was also once called the "Furniture Capital of the World" because of the once-thriving furniture industry.  People visited from all over the country to attend furniture expositions at the Furniture Mart, a building that still stands in the city and houses offices for a variety of companies.  For most of the 20th century, Blackstone Corporation, led by Reginald Lenna, was Jamestown's largest employer and one of the driving cores of the local economy, manufacturing washing machines and automobile components.

History

19th century
Jamestown is named after James Prendergast, an early Chautauqua County settler. His family purchased  in 1806 in the area now known as Chautauqua County. James Prendergast explored the area that is now Jamestown. and saw the area to be valuable, and so he purchased an additional  of land in the area in 1808. In the fall of 1809, Prendergast and an employee, John Blowers, built a log cabin, which became the first building in Jamestown. Another log cabin, as well as mills and a dam, were built on the Chadakoin River later on. In 1855, a night watch was created for the purpose of looking out for fires.

Jamestown was incorporated into a village in 1827 and incorporated into a city on April 19, 1886. Oscar F. Price was elected as the first mayor of the city on April 13, 1886. James Murray was appointed the first Chief of Police and would lead a force of six police officers.

In 1887, Jamestown Electric Light and Power Company, Art Metal, and WCA Hospital were established. In 1888, Jamestown Woolen Spinning Co. was established and the cornerstone of Holy Trinity Lutheran Church laid. In 1889, the American Aristotype Co. was established. The first electric trolley car in Jamestown made its appearance in 1890. In 1891, a fire destroyed the Old Homestead Hotel at Third and Pine Streets and four people died, but the James Prendergast Library and the Municipal Light Plant were established the same year. 

In 1892, Chautauqua Worsted mills was founded. In 1893, Jamestown Veneer Works was started by Nathan Wilson, and Jamestown's first ice cream company started making Collins Ice Cream. In 1895, the cornerstone of City Hall was laid and the City Council decided to lay no more wooden sidewalks. Eleazer Green was elected mayor the same year. In 1896, Empire Worsted Mills was formed; in 1898, Chautauqua Towel Mills was opened; and in 1899, Henry H. Cooper was elected mayor.

20th century

In 1900, Tinkham Brothers established their business, the Furniture Index was published, and the Hall Textile Corporation was formed. In 1903, Jamestown purchased a water system and the J.P. Danielson Tool Co. was organized. In 1906, James L. Weeks was elected mayor. In 1907, the Crescent Tool Company was started by Karl Peterson and Charles F. Falldine. In 1908, Samuel A. Carlson was elected mayor. Music Study Club and Jamestown Symphony Orchestra began the same year.

In 1910, the excavation began for the construction of Jamestown General Hospital, which still stands in the present day. In 1911, the Norden Club was started. On August 6, actress Lucille Ball was born in Jamestown. The first plane ever to fly over Jamestown did so on September 28, 1911. The Norden Clubhouse was completed in 1914. On April 8, 1917, Company E left for guard duty. The Emerson Glass Company started the same year. In 1918, Jamestown Corp. formed to make airplane propellers. A steamship, the City of Pittsburgh sank at the Boatlanding, also in 1918.

In 1921, the Zonta Club was organized. In 1925, the Hotel Samuels was sold. That same year, the Scottish Rite Temple was formally opened and taxpayers voted a $350,000 bond issue for the Third Street Bridge. The following year, Third Street Bridge was completed and it still stands today. In 1927, Jamestown celebrated the centennial of its incorporation as a village. Lars Larson was elected mayor the same year. In 1930, Samuel A. Carlson served as mayor once again. In 1931, a fire destroyed the old Martyn Factory. Also, the city purchases Niagara, Lockport and Ontario Power Company.

In 1932, the ground was broken for the new armory, the Erie Railroad station was dedicated, and the Community Chest was permanently formed. In 1933, Elk Furniture Company was sold. Also, Milton Carlson and Frederick Larson took over Jamestown Airport. The board of education assumed title to school forest. Also in 1933, city councilman Leon F. Roberts was elected mayor. In 1934, Jamestown Airport Corp. offered an airport to the city and the city secured the old armory as a relief center. As part of The New Deal, ground was broken for a new high school, which provided jobs during the Great Depression.

In 1935, the Board of Education opened the new industrial arts building and City Council approved $314,000 airport for North Main Street site. In November, Jamestown High School was formally dedicated. In 1937, the Temple Hesed Abraham was dedicated and the Alfred Collegiate Extension Center opened with 80 students. In 1938, Kevin McElrath became mayor and Jamestown General Hospital's maternity annex opened. In 1939, twelve local plans surveyed by the government to produce supplies in wartime. Also, the city's new airport was formally dedicated.

In 1940, the PONY league baseball began and Co. E was inducted into federal service. In 1941, Jamestown Municipal Stadium was dedicated and Samuel A. Stroth was elected mayor. In 1942, East Second Street widening was ordered and flames destroyed the old state armory. In 1945, Jamestown was hit by a tornado. In 1946, Dr. Carlyle C. Ring was named superintendent of schools. C.C. Ring Elementary School presently stands, in his honor. In 1950, Jamestown Community College was opened.

In 1951, Stanley A. Weeks was elected mayor and the addition to the municipal power plant was opened. In 1954, Samuel A. Stroth was elected mayor and Allegheny Airlines began east-west flight via Jamestown. In 1955, Carl F. Sanford was elected mayor. In 1956, Lucille Ball and Desi Arnaz visited Jamestown. In 1957, a $400,000 runway improvement to Jamestown Municipal Airport was added. In 1958, a new sewage disposal plant was opened, Buffalo Street pumping station was modernized, and a new wing opened at Jamestown General Hospital. In 1959, Jamestown's new post office was started. In 1960, Jamestown celebrated the sesquicentennial of the first house erected here. That same year, Mohawk Airlines started to serve Jamestown.

In 1961, Jamestown Community College moved into new Falconer Street campus and William D. Whitehead was elected mayor. In 1963, the City's first parking ramp opened at Main and Second Streets and Frederick H. Dunn elected mayor. Additionally, Grandin Mills on Allen Street was destroyed by fire and singer Natalie Merchant was born in Jamestown. In 1964, the Washington Street Bridge was completed. In 1967, an addition to Jamestown High School was completed. Also, Jamestown Community College opened a new Science and Engineering Building. In that same year, Charles B. Magnuson was elected mayor. In 1968, an addition to the James Prendergast Free Library was completed. In 1969, the Cherry Street parking ramp was opened, passenger rail service to Jamestown discontinued the next year by Erie-Lackawanna Railway, Stanley N. Lundine was elected mayor, and the New Gustavus Adolphus Children's Home opened. In 1970, the Final approval was granted for the Brooklyn Square Urban Renewal Project.

Throughout the 1970s, homes in Brooklyn Square were relocated as well as many stores and shops. A second Urban Renewal Project was proposed in 2006, and the project began in 2007. Jamestown has hosted thirteen Babe Ruth World Series since 1980 and hosted the 13-Year-Old Babe Ruth World Series in 2008. The James Prendergast Library has regularly ranked in the top ten in the nation among those that service populations of 25,000-49,999, according to HAPLR, with a peak ranking of fourth in 2004. .

21st century

On August 1, 2018, Jamestown opened the Jamestown National Comedy Center. This became the official National Comedy Center, receiving national designation from Congress.

Climate
Jamestown has a humid continental climate (Köppen Dfb). Winters are cold and snowy, while summers are warm and humid.

Demographics

As of the census of 2000, there were 31,730 people, 13,558 households, and 7,904 families residing in the city. The population density was 3,534.6 inhabitants per square mile (1,364.3/km2). There were 15,027 housing units at an average density of 1,673.9 per square mile (646.1/km2). The racial makeup of the city was 91.52% White, 3.39% African American, 0.64% Native American, 0.44% Asian, 0.05% Pacific Islander, 1.8% from other races, and 2.16% from two or more races. Regarding ethnicity the largest ethnic group reported in the 2000 Census was Italian and the second largest was Swedish. 19.7% were of Italian, 18.1% Swedish, 12.8% German, 9.0% Irish, 8.7% English and 5.5% American ancestry. Hispanic or Latino of any race were 4.94% of the population, according to Census 2000

Historically, up until the 1980s, Jamestown comprised primarily people of Italian or Swedish descent, about fifty percent of the population being of Italian descent, and fifty percent being of Swedish descent. Jamestown's strong heritage is showcased at the local museum, The Fenton History Center, which boasts both a Swedish Room and an Italian Room.

There were 13,558 households, out of which 29.4% had children under the age of 18 living with them, 39.1% were married couples living together, 14.5% had a female householder with no husband present, and 41.7% were non-families. 35.0% of all households were made up of individuals, and 13.9% had someone living alone who was 65 years of age or older. The average household size was 2.29 and the average family size was 2.94.

In the city, the age distribution of the population shows 25.8% under the age of 18, 9.1% from 18 to 24, 28.1% from 25 to 44, 20.9% from 45 to 64, and 16.0% who were 65 years of age or older. The median age was 36 years. For every 100 females, there were 91.0 males. For every 100 females age 18 and over, there were 87.3 males.

The median income for a household in the city was $25,837, and the median income for a family was $33,675. Males had a median income of $30,003 versus $20,039 for females. The per capita income for the city was $15,316. About 15.8% of families and 19.5% of the population were below the poverty line, including 29.1% of those under age 18 and 10.2% of those age 65 or over.

Government
The government of the City of Jamestown is a mayor-council form of government.

Executive branch
The executive branch consists of a mayor elected to four-year terms without term limits, and the heads of the departments, most of them appointed by the mayor.

This section lists the mayors of Jamestown, New York.

Legislative branch
The legislative body of Jamestown consists of nine council members, who are elected every two years without any term limits. Six council members represent each of the city's six wards, and three additional council members are known as councilmembers-at-large, representing the entire city. The table below outlines the current members of the Jamestown City Council.

Current

Former

Culture

Museums
 The Fenton History Center, located in the former Gov. Reuben Fenton Mansion is named for former resident Reuben Fenton, the 25th Governor of New York.
 The Lucille Ball-Desi Arnaz Center is dedicated to the city's best-known daughter, Lucille Ball, and held a ceremony in honor of what would have been Ball's 100th birthday in August 2011. Washington Street Bridge has also been fully rebuilt and renovated and renamed the Lucy Desi Bridge.
The Jamestown Gateway Train Station at 211-217 West Second Street in downtown Jamestown
The National Comedy Center opened on August 1, 2018. It currently holds the personal archives of George Carlin, Shelley Berman and the Smothers Brothers.
 The Robert H. Jackson Center was built to preserve the life and legacy of Robert H. Jackson while educating the community about justice and tolerance with a continuing emphasis on the Nuremberg Trials. 
 The Roger Tory Peterson Institute of Natural History continues the legacy of Roger Tory Peterson by promoting the teaching and study of nature, and to thereby create knowledge of and appreciation and responsibility for the natural world.

Sports
Jamestown was the home city for the Jamestown Jammers baseball team of the New York–Penn League. The Jammers were the Single A Short Season affiliate of the Pittsburgh Pirates.  Following the 2014 season, the Jammers announced they would be relocating to Morgantown, West Virginia. It was later announced that a new team in the Prospect League (which, in turn, has since moved to the Perfect Game Collegiate Baseball League) would replace the Jammers, and the team would keep the name. The Jammers played in Jamestown until 2019, when the team was moved to Milwaukee, WI. However, the franchise was donated to Jamestown Community Baseball, LLC, and has been community-owned since. The team currently plays under the name of the Tarp Skunks.

The Jamestown Jackals are a professional basketball team which competes in The Basketball League (TBL). Founded and owned by Jamestown native Kayla Crosby in 2015, the team plays their games at Jamestown Community College. The team earned national attention from a 2021 GQ exposé detailing former Div 1 basketball star Anthony Estes' journey from homelessness to professional basketball as a member of the Jackals.

Northwest Arena is a 1,900 seat ice arena in the city. Among the teams that have played in the arena as primary tenants included the Jamestown Rebels and Jamestown Ironmen of the North American Hockey League, the Jamestown Jets of the Greater Metro Junior A Hockey League, the Jamestown Vikings of the Mid-Atlantic Hockey League, the Jamestown Titans of the North Eastern Hockey League, and the Southern Tier Xpress of the North American 3 Hockey League. The Jamestown Rebels will begin playing at the arena in 2018, returning the NAHL to Jamestown after a five-year absence.

Jamestown High School's boys and girls basketball teams have both won numerous Sectional and Division titles, with the basketball team winning back to back Section VI titles in 2009–10, 2010–11 while reaching the NYSPHSAA Class AA State Championship in 2011. The High School football team has been to five New York State Championships, losing in 1993, and winning in 1994, 1995, 2000 and 2014.

Jamestown hosted its 15th Babe Ruth World Series in August 2011.

Jamestown hosted, at what is now Northwest Arena, three exhibition games prior to the start of the 2011 World Junior Ice Hockey Championships.

Retail
Chautauqua Mall is in nearby Lakewood; most of the Jamestown area's big-box stores are located just outside city limits in Lakewood and a stretch between Lakewood and Jamestown known by the Census Bureau as Jamestown West. 

The first Jamesway store opened in Jamestown. It later relocated to Chautauqua Mall.  Jamesway has since left the mall and was replaced by Office Max (which in turn was replaced by Ollie's Bargain Outlet), J.C. Penney, and Sakura Chinese Buffet.

Twin towns — Sister cities
Jamestown is twinned with:
 Haicheng, Liaoning, China
 Jakobstad, Finland
 Cantù, Lombardy, Italy
 Jakova, Kosovo

Geography 

The Chadakoin River runs through Jamestown.

Major employers

The Jamestown area has a few large manufacturing plants that are major employers in this region. The area was once known as the "furniture capital of the world" for its many furniture and brass hardware manufacturers. Chain stores have opened in recent years in the surrounding area, including Walmart, KMart, Wegmans, CVS, and Rite Aid.

UPMC Chautauqua is a regional hospital that was founded as WCA Hospital (Women's Christian Association) on May 23, 1885, and included a nursing school until Jamestown Community College filled the need with a two-year RN nursing program. Integrated with UPMC (University of Pittsburgh Medical Center) in 2016, it has a school of Medical Technology and Radiology Technology. Jamestown General Hospital still stands on Jones Hill and is part of UPMC Chautauqua. It houses mental health units as well as physical, drug, and alcohol rehab units. The main campus of UPMC Chautauqua (formerly known as WCA Hospital or UPMC Chautauqua WCA Hospital) is located on the corner of Allen Street and Foote Avenue.

Chautauqua County has about 2,200 farms. Although its primary agricultural product is milk, Chautauqua County is also the state's greatest producer of wine and jelly grapes. The area's production of Concord grapes is one of the nation's largest, second only to California.

Jamestown is also home to the Cummins Jamestown Engine Plant. It is the largest single employer in the city, with more than 1,500 employees. They produce heavy duty diesel engines for agricultural, industrial, and military purposes.

Education
SUNY Jamestown Community College provides a two-year education and four-year degrees through matriculation agreements with several universities. Recent additions to the campus include a state-of-the-art LEED-certified science building and three residence halls. Jamestown Business College, near the downtown core, now offers a four-year degree.

Founded in 1867, Jamestown Public Schools is the city's sole school district. The district also extends into several bordering towns. Jamestown Public Schools include: Jamestown High School; three middle schools, Persell Middle School, George Washington Middle School, and Thomas Jefferson Middle School; as well as five neighborhood elementary schools, Lincoln elementary school, Fletcher elementary school, Clinton V Bush elementary school, CC Ring elementary school, and Love elementary school. The former Rogers Elementary School now functions as a Success Academy for selected Jamestown area students.  A disciplinary Tech Academy, located on Fourth Street is also part of the Jamestown Public School system.

The Red Raider Marching Band won the NY State Field Band Conference Championship in 2014 and 2015.

Transportation

Air
The Chautauqua County-Jamestown Airport (JHW) is north of the city and provides charter air service.

Bus
Bus service is provided by Coach USA of Erie. Connections are available to the Greyhound service in Buffalo. There is also a county-wide bus service (CARTS) and taxi service through various companies including Rainbow Cab and UBER.

Rail
Present-day Jamestown is on the mainline of the Western New York and Pennsylvania Railroad which provides freight service. A proposal to connect the WNYP to the New York and Lake Erie Railroad would allow for excursion rail service; to do so, the NYLE would need to undergo extensive rehabilitation of the rail lines near the junction between the two rail lines at Waterboro, several miles east of Jamestown. Amtrak does not serve the area, except through contract with Coach USA to provide Thruway Motorcoach service along Coach USA's existing bus route to bus Amtrak passengers to and from the Exchange Street Station in Buffalo.

Until 1950, two railroad companies traveled through Jamestown: 
Erie Railroad – mainline passing through Jamestown (New York to Chicago), whose last trains were the Atlantic Express/Pacific Express (discontinued, 1965) and the Lake Cities (discontinued, 1970).
Jamestown, Westfield and Northwestern Railroad - freight and passenger interurban train company, which went defunct in 1950.

In 1976, the Erie-Lackawanna Railroad was absorbed into Conrail, and then ultimately, by Norfolk Southern Railway and CSX Transportation in 1998.

The Erie Railroad's former Jamestown Station still exists and was listed on the National Register of Historic Places in 2003. It is now home to a portion of the National Comedy Center which opened in Summer of 2018.

An electric interurban railroad—Jamestown, Westfield and Northwestern Railroad (JW&NW)—connected all three above towns (Jamestown-Mayville-Westfield) and ran along the north side of Lake Chautauqua. The JW&NW ended passenger operation in 1947, continued with freight, then quit entirely in 1950. Its rails and right-of-way have slowly disappeared.

Highways
The Southern Tier Expressway (Interstate 86/Route 17) passes to the north and east of Jamestown, with direct access to the city from Exits 12 and 13. New York State Routes 60 (Foote Avenue) and 394 (Fairmount Avenue on the west side, Second Street on the east) pass through the city north-to-south and east-to-west, respectively; Route 430 (Fluvanna Avenue) begins in Jamestown and follows a westward path. U.S. Route 62 passes by Jamestown to the southeast.

Media

Broadcast stations
The following stations are licensed to Jamestown or its immediate suburbs:

AM radio
WJTN – 1240 – gold-based adult contemporary music (simulcast on FM 101.3)
WKSN – 1340 – oldies

FM radio
WUBJ – 88.1 – NPR news/talk (simulcast of WBFO in Buffalo)
WYRR – 88.9 – radio evangelism (SonLife owned-and-operated station)
WNJA – 89.7 – Classical (simulcast of WNED-FM in Buffalo)
WCOT – 90.9 – contemporary Christian music (Family Life Network owned-and-operated station)
WWSE – 93.3 – hot adult contemporary
WLKW – 95.3 – contemporary Christian music (K-Love owned-and-operated station, licensed to Celoron)
W262BX – 100.3 – country (simulcast of WBKX in Fredonia)
WHUG – 101.9 – country
WOGM-LP – 104.7 – religious (Fundamental Broadcasting Network)
WKZA – 106.9 – contemporary hit radio (licensed to Lakewood)
WRFA-LP – 107.9 – community radio

TV
WNYB, channel 26, is the only station licensed to Jamestown. It has no local operations and was, for all but its first three years of existence operated out of Buffalo. The station, a TCT owned-and-operated station, now operates the straight TCT national feed. Its transmitter is located well north of Jamestown, in Arkwright.

Previous transmitters that had carried Trinity Broadcasting Network (W10BH) and WNED-TV (W46BA) have since been shut down.

WNY News Now, based in Jamestown, operates a daily local newscast that is distributed online. Lilly Broadcasting, owners of radio stations in Warren, Pennsylvania and TV stations in Erie, Pennsylvania, signed a shared services agreement with WNY News Now in July 2021.

NOAA Weather Radio
WNG541 – 162.525 (licensed to Frewsburg; operated out of the National Weather Service office in Cheektowaga)

Newspapers
The daily The Post-Journal is published in Jamestown. Free weekly papers distributed in the city include the Jamestown Pennysaver, the Chautauqua Star, and the Jamestown Gazette.

Notable people

Business
 John Jachym, businessman and sportsman
 Reginald Lenna, businessman and philanthropist
 Willis R. Whitney, founder of the research laboratory of the General Electric Company

Entertainment and arts
 Douglas Ahlstedt, opera singer
 Theodore Albrecht, music historian
 Brad Anderson, cartoonist
 Mitchell Anderson, notable character actor
 Marshall Arisman, illustrator
 Fred Ball, movie studio executive, actor, brother of Lucille Ball
 Lucille Ball, actress, comedian, and businesswoman was born in Jamestown and raised in nearby Celeron; two life-size statues of her are in Celoron Park.  
 Suzan Ball, actress and second cousin of Lucille and Fred Ball
 Rob Buck, founding member of 10,000 Maniacs
 Nick Carter, singer, member of the Backstreet Boys
 Dennis Drew, keyboardist for 10,000 Maniacs
 William Feather, publisher and author
 Vagn F. Flyger, wildlife biologist, one of the world's foremost authorities on squirrels
 Gilbert Dennison Harris, notable geologist
 Hayward A. Harvey, inventor of the Harvey process
 Shawn Higbee, professional motorcycle racer
 Harry Pratt Judson, second President of the University of Chicago
 Laura Kightlinger, actress, comedian, writer
 John Lombardo, founding member of 10,000 Maniacs
 Natalie Merchant, singer; her band 10,000 Maniacs originated in Jamestown; their gold and platinum records hang in Jamestown City Hall
 The Mighty Wallop!, rock band
 Pandora Boxx, drag queen, contestant on second season of reality-television series RuPaul's Drag Race
 Marc Parnell, author and ornithologist
 Julie Anne Peters, author
 Roger Tory Peterson, naturalist
 Charles Pitts, radio engineer and LGBTQ+ freeform radio pioneer
 Jackson Rohm, country/pop musician
 Elliott Fitch Shepard, owner of the Mail and Express newspaper
 Ira Spring, photographer, author
 Jud Strunk, singer/songwriter
 Dale Willman, award-winning journalist
 Thomas B. Woodworth, newspaper publisher, lawyer

Military
 Wilfred Beaver, World War I flying ace
 John B. Hayes, retired US Coast Guard Admiral and 16th Commandant of the US Coast Guard
 Harriet L. Leete, Red Cross nurse in World War I

Science and technology
 Louis W. Roberts, microwave physicist

Sports
 Cheryl Bailey, Executive Director of the National Women's Soccer League
 Hugh Bedient, former MLB pitcher
 Walter Brown, former MLB player
 Leon Carlson, former MLB relief pitcher
 Stephen Carlson, NFL tight end
 Parke H. Davis, football player and coach
 Michael G. Foster, karate pioneer
 Roger Goodell, NFL commissioner, born and raised in Jamestown
 Dwight Lowry, former MLB catcher
 Jim McCusker, retired NFL player
 Irv Noren, former professional baseball and basketball player
 Nick Sirianni, NFL head coach

Politics
 Augustus F. Allen, former US Congressman
 Alfred W. Benson, former US Senator from Kansas
 Samuel A. Carlson, former mayor of Jamestown
 Reuben Fenton, congressman, senator, and Governor of New York was born in the nearby Town of Carroll and made his home in Jamestown.
 Andy Goodell, New York State Assemblyman
 Charles Goodell, former US Senator, father of NFL Commissioner Roger Goodell
 Mihal Grameno, Albanian rilindas, politician, writer, freedom fighter, journalist
 Alva L. Hager, former US Congressman from Iowa
 Abner Hazeltine, former U.S. Congressman
 Robert H. Jackson, U.S. Solicitor General, U.S. Attorney General, U.S. Supreme Court associate justice and Nuremberg chief prosecutor, graduated from Jamestown High School, lived and practiced law in Jamestown from 1910–1934, was buried following an October 1954 funeral at Jamestown's St. Luke's Episcopal Church
 Stanley Lundine, politician, Mayor of Jamestown, Congressman, Lieutenant Governor of New York
 Richard P. Marvin, former US Congressman
 Francis W. Palmer, former US Congressman
 William Parment, former New York State Assemblyman
 Jess Present, former New York State Senator
 Porter Sheldon, former US Congressman
 George Stoneman, born in nearby Busti, New York, and studied at the Jamestown Academy, became a Civil War General and the 15th Governor of California.
 Samuel Teresi, mayor of Jamestown
 Davis Hanson Waite, 8th Governor of Colorado
 Walter Washington, first African-American Mayor of Washington, D.C., raised in Jamestown

References

Sources

Bibliography

Further reading

External links

 
 Jamestown Up Close
 Jamestown Historic Timeline

 
Cities in New York (state)
Western New York
Populated places established in 1810
Cities in Chautauqua County, New York
1810 establishments in New York (state)